Orthetrum machadoi, common name highland skimmer or Machado's skimmer, is a species of dragonfly in the family Libellulidae. It is found in Angola, Botswana, Cameroon, the Democratic Republic of the Congo, Ethiopia, Kenya, Malawi, Mozambique, Namibia, Sierra Leone, South Africa, Tanzania, Uganda, Zambia, Zimbabwe, and possibly Burundi. Its natural habitats are subtropical or tropical moist lowland forests, subtropical or tropical dry shrubland, subtropical or tropical moist shrubland, rivers, shrub-dominated wetlands, swamps, freshwater marshes, and intermittent freshwater marshes.

References

External links

 Orthetrum machadoi on African Dragonflies and Damselflies Online

Libellulidae
Taxonomy articles created by Polbot
Insects described in 1955